BBYO (formerly B'nai B'rith Youth Organization Inc.) is a Jewish teen movement, organized as a 501(c)(3) nonprofit organization and headquartered in Washington, D.C. The organization is intended to build the identity of Jewish teens and offer leadership development programs.

On June 19, 2001, the movement split from B'nai B'rith International, which had been its parent organization, to become incorporated as B'nai B'rith Youth Organization Inc.

BBYO is organized into local fraternity- and sorority-like chapters. Male chapters are known as AZA chapters and their members are known as Alephs, and female chapters as BBG chapters, their members known as BBGs.  AZA and BBG were independent organizations (beginning in 1924 and 1944 respectively) before becoming brother and sister organizations under B'nai B'rith. In some communities, there are co-ed BBYO chapters which borrow traditions from both organizations.

Organizational model 
The organization is active in more than 70 regions, in Europe, South Africa, Australia and North America. BBYO has more than 75,000 members and over 250,000 alumni, as well as about 800 volunteer advisors.

BBYO connects Jewish youth with their cultural Jewish roots. By using modern technologies and offering innovative possibilities, the organization reaches many young people.

History

Early days of BBYO

AZA's original advisor, Nathan Mnookin, soon left Omaha for his hometown of Kansas City, where he started a similar group with the same name.  The Omaha group selected a new advisor, Sam Beber, who soon laid out his plans for an international youth movement based on the local AZA model.  In 1924, the Aleph Tzadik Aleph for Young Men, now an international Jewish fraternity, was formed according to Kubo's plan, with the Omaha and Kansas City chapters receiving the first two charters.  Four chapters were in attendance at the first convention in June 1924, and ten at the second convention the following summer.

By 1925, AZA had expanded east with dozens of chapters across the country.  At Beber's urging, B'nai B'rith took up the issue of officially adopting AZA as its junior auxiliary at their national convention in 1925.  Supported by Henry Monsky, who himself was vying for the B'nai B'rith presidency, the convention adopted a committee report affirming its approval of the organization under B'nai B'rith's jurisdiction.  Immediately following the convention, B'nai B'rith Executive Committee met and officially adopted AZA, which then became known as the Aleph Zadik Aleph of B'nai B'rith.

BBYO's beginnings
In 1944, after a few past failed attempts to begin a Jewish youth group for young women, B'nai B'rith Girls (BBG) became officially recognized and adopted by B'nai B'rith.  Anita Perlman is credited with the development of BBG as Sam Beber is credited with the AZA.  For the first time, AZA and BBG were united under a single organization, officially cementing their relationship and brother and sister organizations.  Combined, the two youth movements were called the B'nai B'rith Youth Organization, and BBYO was born.

From past to present with BBYO
Although the organization has changed greatly behind-the-scenes over the years, its original tenets still remain true: dedication to Jewish life, a pluralistic approach, commitment to community service and social action, and a youth leadership model.  BBYO continues to be open to all teenagers that identify themselves as Jews, without exception.  Members participate in meeting rituals and sing pep songs that date back to the organization's earliest days.  The organization continues to maintain and contribute to its International Service Fund, initiated at the very first international convention.  Although the number of professional staff has increased dramatically, BBYO continues to maintain democratic youth leadership at the every level.

Just as the organization changed greatly in its first few years, starting as a local youth group to being adopted as the official youth auxiliary of the world's largest Jewish organization, it likewise has undergone drastic changes in recent years.  After more than 75 years of a general prosperity, B'nai B'rith began a massive restructuring at the turn of the 21st century in response to the changing face of North American Jewry.  As a result, what was then the B'nai B'rith Youth Organization split from B'nai B'rith and, on June 19, 2001, it was incorporated as B'nai B'rith Youth Organization Inc., a separate nonprofit organization. The new organization received substantial funding from the Charles and Lynn Schusterman Family Foundation, and it was chaired by Lynn Schusterman.

Traditionally, BBYO was a conglomeration of many largely independent regions.  This was the result of the modification of B'nai B'rith's long-standing "district" model.  As new forms of communication have brought the members and staff of BBYO in closer contact, and as the differences between geographic regions continue to deteriorate, BBYO has become much more of a top-down organization, with standardized marketing materials and directives.  BBYO has reached into the online market with its b-linked.org website, into the middle school market with its BBYO Connect programs, and into the adult market with its Friends & Alumni Network.

See also
UK and Ireland BBYO
List of Jewish fraternities and sororities

References

External links

 

B'nai B'rith
Jewish youth organizations
Youth-led organizations
Youth organizations established in 1944
Youth organizations based in Canada
Youth organizations based in Washington, D.C.